Rocketium is a SaaS marketing software company registered in Newark, Delaware, United States. The company has built several products, with the core business being about creative automation and design process automation. Marketing and creative teams of global businesses use Rocketium's self-service platform to produce banners, GIFs and videos at a massive scale. These are used for marketing campaigns, site merchandising, and internal communication.

History
Former TaxiForSure colleagues, Satej Sirur and Anurag Dwivedi created Rocketium in June 2015.

Starting as a game-based content platform aimed at making educative and informative quizzes and simulation games, the founders pivoted to building a video-making tool in June 2016 when they saw the growing trend of online videos and realized there was a lack of scalable and easy-to-use video creation platforms. This self-service tool was aimed at the B2C segment of non-designers like social media marketers, content writers, and journalists.

In November 2018, Rocketium pivoted to a B2B SaaS platform for businesses. Rocketium's automation platform works to enable custom workflows for businesses that need to produce images and videos at a large scale, while maintaining brand compliance.

Funding
 Rocketium raised $1.1M in seed funding from early-stage venture capital firm Blume Ventures and 1Crowd with a clutch of angel investors from BigBasket, Apple Inc., Freshworks, Microsoft and SpaceX.
 Rocketium raised $3.2 million in 2021. The funding round was led by Emergent Ventures. Rocketium’s platform is currently invite-only, and it plans to open self-service usage and purchases in 2022, along with more integrations with e-commerce and advertising platforms (its current integrations include Salesforce, Mailchimp, YouTube, Vimeo, Wistia and Hubspot).

Products
 Rocketium Campaign
 Rocketium API
 Rocketium Button

References

External links
Official website

Software companies established in 2015
Marketing software
Software companies of the United States
American companies established in 2015